Biddaddaba is a rural locality in the Scenic Rim Region, Queensland, Australia.

Geography 
Biddaddaba is nestled in a small valley formed by the Biddaddaba Creek, a tributary of Canungra Creek, itself a tributary of the Albert River.  The heavily vegetated slopes of a ridge extending in a north/south direction and climbing to elevations of more than 500 m above sea level, form a summit at Mount Misery in the east.  In the west, Mount Tabragalba is the highest point along another ridge with roughly half the prominence.  Like many parts of the Scenic Rim the area is mostly used for agricultural purposes.  Several large dams are scattered throughout the locality.

History
The locality takes its name from Biddaddaba Creek, which in turn was named with an Bundjalung language word  burubi-da meaning place of koalas.

Biddaddaba Creek State School opened on 18 April 1933 and closed in 1959.

On Sunday 6 October 1935, Archbishop James Duhig officially opened Our Lady of the Assumption Catholic Church. From March 1932, Catholic mass had been held in private homes in the district. Duhig commented that it was the smallest church he had opened. The church was at 67 Biddaddaba Creek Road. In the 1950s, the church building was relocated to Park Ridge where it continues to operate as Our Lady of the Assumption Catholic church (now within the boundaries of Park Ridge South).

The other top responses for country of birth were England 4.4% and New Zealand 3.1%.  88.9% of people only spoke English at home.

Education 
There are no schools in Biddaddaba. The nearest government primary schools are Beaudesert State School in Beaudesert to the west and Canungra State School in neighbouring Canungra to the south-west. The nearest government secondary school is Beaudesert State High School in Beaudesert.

References

Further reading

 

Scenic Rim Region
Localities in Queensland